Lieutenant General Cherish Mathson, PVSM, SM, VSM is a retired officer of the Indian Army who served as General Officer-Commanding-in-Chief (GOC-in-C), South Western Command. He assumed office on 1 August 2017 taking over from Lt General Abhay Krishna, and was succeeded by Lt General Alok Singh Kler on 1 September 2019.

Early life and education 
Mathson is an alumnus of Sainik School, Trivandrum and the Defence Services Staff College in Wellington. He has also attended Senior Command Course at Army War College, Mhow, the Long Defence Management Course at the College of Defence Management, Secunderabad and the National Defence College, New Delhi.

Career 
Mathson was commissioned into Garhwal Rifles in June 1980. He has vast experience in rural and urban insurgencies and has served two tenures in Siachen Glacier, in Operation Blue Star, in Mizoram against the Mizo National Front (MNF) and as a UN observer in Somalia. 

He has commanded a battalion on the Line of Control in Jammu and Kashmir during Operation Parakram, the Trivandrum Brigade in an amphibious Role, the 54th Infantry Division in the Southern Command, Inspector General of the Special Frontier Force and the XXI Corps in Bhopal. 

He has also held staff positions including Deputy Assistant Quarter Master General Operations (DAQMG) of an Independent Infantry Brigade, Colonel Administration (Col Adm) of a Mountain Division, Brigadier Administration (Brig Adm) of the XII Corps, Deputy Technical Manager (Land Systems) in Army HQ, Senior Defence Specialist (Military) in the National Security Council Secretariat and in the Defence Acquisition Wing (Ministry of Defence). He was also the Colonel of the Regiment of Garhwal Rifles.

During his career, he has been awarded the Sena Medal, the Vishist Seva Medal in 2010  and the Param Vishisht Seva Medal in 2018.

Honours and decorations

Dates of rank

References 

Living people
Indian generals
Recipients of the Vishisht Seva Medal
Recipients of the Sena Medal
Recipients of the Param Vishisht Seva Medal
Year of birth missing (living people)
National Defence College, India alumni
College of Defence Management alumni
Army War College, Mhow alumni